Hostile Takeover is the fourth and final studio album by American rap group RBL Posse. It was released on May 8, 2001 for Right Way Records and was produced by G-Man Stan. Hostile Takeover proved to be the group's last album as Hitman was shot and killed in San Francisco on February 3, 2003, leaving Black C as the only surviving member.

Track listing
"Intro"- 1:26
"You Know the Rulez"- 3:53
"Where Am I Going To"- 4:57
"The Vapors"- 4:37
"Nightmares"- 4:13
"Frisco, Frisco"- 3:47
"Baller Skit"- 1:03
"Lay'em Down"- 4:03
"Chasin the Sunshine"- 4:01
"Millenium Mayhem"- 3:57
"Stay Pump!"- 3:47
"Fuckin Wit Us"- 3:38
"What!, What!"- 3:57
"Feel Me"- 4:33
"Smooth Sailin'"- 3:58
"Tribute Skit"- 1:29
"Lost a Homie"- 4:09
"R.B.L. 2001"- 4:20
"Hostile Takeover"- 4:48

2001 albums
RBL Posse albums